The Skeleton events have been contested at the Universiade only one at the 2005 as optional sport.

Events

Medalists

Men

Women

Medal table 
Last updated after the 2017 Winter Universiade

References 
Sports123

 
Universiade
Sports at the Winter Universiade